Sven Ziegler (born July 31, 1994) is a German ice hockey player. He is currently playing with the Iserlohn Roosters of the German Deutsche Eishockey Liga (DEL).

Ziegler made his Deutsche Eishockey Liga debut playing with Eisbären Berlin during the 2012–13 DEL season.

Following the 2017–18 season, his sixth with Berlin, Ziegler left as a free agent to sign a one-year contract with the Straubing Tigers on May 3, 2018.

References

External links

1994 births
Living people
German ice hockey right wingers
Eisbären Berlin players
Iserlohn Roosters players
Sportspeople from Nuremberg
Straubing Tigers players